Barnea may refer to:
 Barnea is an olive cultivar, see List of olive cultivars
 Barnea (bivalve), a genus of bivalves in the family Pholadidae
 Barnea is a surname